American Idol Season 10 Highlights: Haley Reinhart is an EP by Haley Reinhart, an American Idol tenth season finalist, composed of her most successful iTunes songs from her time on American Idol plus an additional recording of You Oughta Know. It was released on June 28, 2011, through 19 Entertainment and Interscope Records exclusively for Walmart.

Reception

The EP sold 59,000 copies and spent 4 weeks on the Billboard 200 chart in the United States. "House of the Rising Sun" is also the highest rated studio recording from her season with nearly 5000 reviews giving it 5 stars, with "Bennie and the Jets" not too far behind.

Andrew Leahey of AllMusic said the album is "a surprisingly solid appetizer for her full-length debut."

Michael Slezak of TVLine on her "Bennie and the Jets" studio recording: "Cannot. Stop. Playing. On. Repeat. So! Awesome! Grade: A+"

Track listing

Charts

References 

2011 EPs
19 Recordings EPs
Haley Reinhart albums